Barretto Junior was a 523-ton barque built in Calcutta in 1818 that served as a supply ship and transport vessel. She is best known for supplying Franklin's lost expedition.

History

Early history 
Barretto Junior was built in 1818 in Calcutta (modern day Kolkata, West Bengal). The builders were likely the Portuguese-descended Barretto family, wealthy India-based merchants who founded  Barretto & Co. Joseph Barretto Junior joined in 1806, and purchased two ships: one for operation between Cape of Good Hope and London and one for operation between Macau and other parts of China. The first records of the ship by name was by the Asiatic Journal which reported her in Madras (modern day Chennai) in 1819. By 1839, she appeared in the United Service Journal and Naval and Military Magazine, which reported it was transporting British troops to Gibraltar. In 1845, her owner was Joseph Somes of London, and her master was Iden Huggins.

Franklin expedition 
Royal Navy lieutenant Edward Griffiths was put in charge of Barretto Junior on 18 April 1845, and placed under orders of John Franklin at the Woolwich Dockyard, to help preparation for his expedition to chart the Northwest Passage. Barretto Junior was to carry stores of supplies, provision, and clothing which would be transferred to the expedition ships HMS Erebus and HMS Terror once they had arrived in the arctic. This allowed a larger amount of supplies to be brought on the expedition without overburdening the main vessels, and helped safeguard supplies for the journey across the Atlantic. Barretto Junior also carried live cattle to be slaughtered for fresh meat.

Barretto Junior was accompanied by two steam tugs that helped tow Erebus and Terror to Greenland: HMS Rattler and HMS Blazer. All five ships arrived in Disko Bay on 4 July 1845, and Barretto Junior's stores were transferred to the two expedition ships. On 12 July 1845, Barretto Junior took on all mail from the personnel of the expedition. Among these was a scientific paper entitled "On the Anatomy of Forbesia," written by Harry Duncan Spens Goodsir, which was published posthumously by his brother John Goodsir five years later. Five men of the expedition also returned to England aboard Barretto Junior: William Aitken (marine, Terror), John Brown (able seaman, Terror), Thomas Burt (armourer, Erebus), Robert Carr (armourer, Terror) and James Elliot (sailmaker, Terror).

Barretto Junior returned to Deptford, Kent on 11 August 1845 and Griffith reported that Franklin's men were confident and in good health.

Convict transport 
From December 1845 through the 1850s, Barretto Junior operated as a convict transfer, bringing female convicts from England to Van Diemen's Land (modern day Tasmania) in Australia. Most of the women were young first-time offenders, mostly convicted for theft, and the ship's conditions were dangerous, with prevalent disease, malnourishment, and abuse. On a July 1850 voyage, three women and two children died before reaching land, and the ship was caught in a hurricane off the Cape of Good Hope. One of the women, 23 year old Elizabeth Wilson, committed suicide by jumping overboard and drowning. Between this 1850 voyage and 1859, the ship instead started transporting cargo rather than people.

Sinking 
Barretto Junior was carrying 750 tons of coal to Mayotte when on 25 October 1859, she struck a reef and sank. Eleven of the eighteen crew died, with the survivors being picked up by a vessel called Brisk.

See also 

 Convict ships to Tasmania
 Personnel of Franklin's lost expedition
 List of shipwrecks in October 1859

References 

1818 ships
Shipwrecks in the Indian Ocean
Convict ships to Tasmania
Franklin's lost expedition
Ships built in Kolkata